The 1999 Damallsvenskan was the twelfth season of the Damallsvenskan. Matches were played between 14 April and 29 October  1999. Älvsjö AIK won the title for the fifth time, a record that stood until the end of 2013. They won by eleven points from Umeå IK. Malmö FF finished third. The playoffs were also won by Älvsjö, beating Malmö FF in the final, who therefore finished as runners-up. This was the last time playoffs were used until the 2009 Damallsvenskan.

Before the season, Ornäs BK, Tyresö FF and Östers IF were promoted. The first two teams and Sunnanå SK were relegated at the end of the season.

Table

Playoffs

Semifinals

Final

External links
RSSSF.com

1999
1999 in association football
1999 in Swedish sport